Rue des prairies is a 1959 French drama film directed by Denys de La Patellière. It is an adaptation of a novel by René Lefèvre.

Plot
Widower Henri Neveux (Jean Gabin) has difficult relationships with his children.

Cast 
 Jean Gabin - Henri Neveux
 Marie-José Nat - Odette Neveux 
 Claude Brasseur - Louis, le fils d'Henri
 Roger Dumas - Fernand, l'enfant adopté
 Renée Faure - Me Surville
 Paul Frankeur - Ernest, l'ami d'Henri
 Roger Tréville - M. Jacques Pedrell, l'amant d'Odette

References

External links 

1959 drama films
1959 films
French drama films
Films about families
Films with screenplays by Michel Audiard
French black-and-white films
Films directed by Denys de La Patellière
1950s French films